Lake Albert, originally known as Lake Mwitanzige and temporarily Lake Mobutu Sese Seko, is a lake located in Uganda and the Democratic Republic of the Congo. It is Africa's seventh-largest lake, as well as the second biggest of Uganda's Great Lakes.

Geography
Lake Albert is located on the border between Uganda and the Democratic Republic of the Congo. It is the northernmost of the chain of lakes in the Albertine Rift, the western branch of the East African Rift.

Lake Albert is part of the complicated system of the upper Nile. Its main sources are the White Nile, ultimately coming from Lake Victoria to the southeast, and the Semliki River, which issues from Lake Edward to the southwest. The water of the Victoria Nile is much less saline than that of Lake Albert. The lake's outlet, at its northernmost tip, is the Albert Nile section of the White Nile. The river later becomes known as the Mountain Nile when its course enters South Sudan.

At the southern end of the lake, where the Semliki comes in, there are swamps. The Rwenzori Mountains are to the south of the lake and to the northwest, the Blue Mountains. The few settlements along the shore include Butiaba and Pakwach.

Water characteristics

The water has a pH of around or just below 9 and an electric conductivity of around 720–780 μS/cm. These are both very high for a freshwater lake but nevertheless lower than Lake Edward.

Animals
Lake Albert is home to many aquatic and semi-aquatic animals, including the river hippopotamus, Ugandan kob, red as well as Nile lechwe, Nile crocodile, Nile monitor lizard, African softshell turtle, Central African mud turtle, and Williams' mud turtle. Also present is the giant African bullfrog and the rock python, which can be observed warming themselves on smooth rocks near the water’s edge. A number of terrestrial (but water-loving) snakes, lizards, and amphibians reside at the lake. Water birds are numerous, and include pink-backed pelican, goliath heron, white-faced whistling duck, African fish eagle, wattled plover, and greater flamingo. Several stork species are commonly seen patrolling  the shallow areas; the saddle-billed, yellow-billed, open-billed, Hamerkop (hammerhead), European white, and the rare shoebill storks all frequent the lakeshore and shallows, and roost in surrounding tall trees.

Fish and fishing 
There are 55 fish species in Lake Albert. After Nile crocodiles and larger carnivorous birds, the largest predator in the lake is the Nile perch (native; unlike in other Rift Valley lakes where it’s introduced & invasive), as well as the fearsome-looking elongate tigerfish, African tigerfish, and the electric catfish.

Additionally, there are a number of air-breathing marbled lungfish, reedfish, bichir, cornish jack, Bagrus docmak, African sharptooth catfish and vundu catfish. Other species, that support important local fisheries, include Nile tilapia, Niger barb, Albert lates, and giraffe catfish that are caught by standard fishing methods; the small Brycinus nurse and Engraulicypris bredoi are predominantly caught by light fishing. As much as 30% of the fish production in Uganda is from Lake Albert.

Lake Albert has fewer endemics than the other African Great Lakes. Although the Albert Nile–the section of the Nile that leaves Lake Albert—has several rapids in the Nimule region, these have not effectively isolated the lake from the main Nile sections. In contrast, Lake Edward (and ultimately Lake George) is effectively isolated from Lake Albert by the rapids on the Semliki River, while Lake Kyoga (and ultimately Lake Victoria) is effectively isolated from Lake Albert by the Murchison Falls on the Victoria Nile. As a consequence, most of Lake Albert's fish are widespread riverine species also found in the main Nile sections. There are few haplochromine cichlids; a group that is very diverse in other Rift Valley lakes. Of the six haplochromines in Lake Albert, four are endemic (Haplochromis albertianus, H. avium, H. bullatus and H. mahagiensis) and two are also found in the Nile (H. loati and Pseudocrenilabrus multicolor). In comparison, most of the more than 60 haplochromines in Lake Edward–George and most of the roughly 600 haplochromines in Lake Victoria–Kyoga are endemic. The only other endemic fish species in Lake Albert are the small cyprinid Engraulicypris bredoi and the endangered Albert lates.

History
Lake Albert is still known as Mwitanzige by the Banyoro and Batooro, as well as other peoples who have inhabited the region for centuries before the colonial age.  This name means ‘locust killer’, from omwita ‘killer’ and enzige ‘locusts’ in the Runyoro language.  This is due to a local legend that tells how a plague of locusts had destroyed the crops of the people who were living on the eastern shore of the lake, but when they tried to cross to the other side they never got there. Due to the oral nature of Nyoro culture and the lack of writing before British occupation, it is not possible to know for sure whether this tale actually happened.

In 1864, the explorers Samuel Baker and Flóra von Sass found the lake and renamed it after the recently deceased Prince Albert, consort of Queen Victoria. In the 20th century, Zairian President Mobutu Sese Seko temporarily named the lake after himself.

European colonialists operated shipping on the lake. The British planned shipping on Lake Albert as part of a network of railway, river steamer and lake steamer services linking British interests in Egypt, east Africa and southern Africa. The John I. Thornycroft & Company shipyard at Woolston, Hampshire built the cargo and passenger ship  for this purpose in 1930. She was named after the British Army officer Robert Thorne Coryndon, who was governor of Uganda 1918–22. Winston Churchill described the ship as "the best library afloat" and Ernest Hemingway called her "magnificence on water". She either was scuttled in 1962 or sank in 1964. She remains unsalvaged and partly submerged in the lake  at Butyaba landing site. These can still be seen to date.

Heritage Oil and Tullow Oil have announced major oil finds in the Lake Albert basin, with estimates that the multi-billion barrel field will prove to be the largest onshore field found in sub-Saharan Africa for more than twenty years.

In March 2014, a boat carrying Congolese refugees capsized in Lake Albert, killing more than 250 people.

On 26 December 2016, a boat carrying 45 members and fans of a local village football team capsized in Lake Albert killing at least 30 people.

On 24 December 2020, thirty people died when a boat capsized in en route from Uganda to Congo. The passengers were concerned about travel restrictions related to the COVID-19 pandemic in Africa.

The Kibiro settlement on Lake Albert has cultural and archeological significance.

Gallery

See also
Energy in Uganda

References

External links

 
Food and Agriculture Organization of the United Nations
World Lakes Database entry for Lake Albert
"East African Railways and Harbours, Marine Services": photos of East African lake ferries including SS Robert Coryndon

 
African Great Lakes
Lakes of the Great Rift Valley
Lakes of the Democratic Republic of the Congo
Lakes of Uganda
Democratic Republic of the Congo–Uganda border
Nile
International lakes of Africa